Christopher Douglas (born May 17, 1990, in Orlando, Florida) is an American ice sled hockey player.

Douglas was a member of the United States gold medal-winning teams at the 2015 IPC Ice Sledge Hockey World Championships in Buffalo, New York, United States, and at the 2019 World Para Ice Hockey Championships in Ostrava, Czech Republic.

He was also a member of the United States silver medal-winning team at the 2017 World Para Ice Hockey Championships in Gangneung, South Korea.

References

External links 
 
 

1990 births
Living people
American sledge hockey players
Sportspeople from Orlando, Florida